Sinbad and the Minotaur is a 2011 Australian fantasy B movie directed by Karl Zwicky serving as an unofficial sequel to the 1947 Douglas Fairbanks Jr. film and Harryhausen's Sinbad trilogy. It combines Arabian Nights hero Sinbad the Sailor with the Greek legend of the Minotaur.

Plot
Sinbad, his first mate Karim and slave girl Tara embark on a voyage to Crete in search of King Minos's treasure believed to be hidden within the fabled Labyrinth. They are pursued by the evil Sorcerer Al Jibbar who bears a striking resemblance to Sokurah, the antagonist of the Seventh Voyage of Sinbad. Al Jibbar's cannibal henchman is seemingly immortal, capable of surviving grievous wounds and highly skilled in the ways of the Indian Jettis, strongmen capable of torturing and killing prisoners with their bare hands.

The story begins where Sinbad enters Al-Jibar's camp. There, he meets Tara and 3 other harem belly dancers. Tara tells Sinbad that the 3 women were hypnotized by Al-Jibar and that she is looking for someone to rescue her. Sinbad refuses to rescue her so Tara screams. Al-Jibar and his henchmen come in. Tara lies about seeing a rat. Serif finds Sinbad. Sinbad and Tara escape.

Cast
 Manu Bennett as Sinbad
 Steven Grives as Al Jibbar
 Pacharo Mzembe as Karim
 Holly Brisley as Tara, former slave, Princess of Lycia, and Sinbad's love interest.
 Jared Robinsen as Seif
 Terry Antionak as Nestor
 Lily Brown Griffiths as Ariana
 Derek Boyer as Akroom
 Hugh Parker as Boz
 Brad Mcmurry as Timos
 Lauren Horner as Luna, a belly dancing girl
 Nick Pendragon as the Feast Master
 Dimitri Baveas as Pericles
 David Vallon as Minos
 Vivienne Albitia as Serving Wench
 Sam Elia as Hajibi
 Anthony Thomas as Al Jibbar's sentry
Selwi Greensill, Rebecca Convoy, and Fleur Thompson as belly dancing slave girls

Reception

References

External links
 Sinbad and the Minotaur on Rotten Tomatoes
 Sinbad and the Minotaur on IMDb

Australian fantasy films
2010s children's fantasy films
2010s English-language films
Australian fantasy adventure films
Films based on Sinbad the Sailor
Seafaring films
2010s monster movies
Pirate films
Films set in the Middle East
Films set in ancient Greece
Films set in Crete
Sword and sorcery films
Films based on classical mythology
Films directed by Karl Zwicky
Cultural depictions of Pericles
2010s Australian films